Karl Sarafidis, born March 6, 1979, in Beirut, Lebanon, is a French, Greek and Lebanese philosopher and actor. Doctor in philosophy, holder of the Agrégation, he taught at Paris-East Créteil University, Paris 1 Panthéon-Sorbonne University and at the French University College (Moscow State University-Lomonosov). Specialist in contemporary philosophy, his thesis topic was on the resumption of metaphysics in Heidegger's and Bergson's thought. In 2013, he published Bergson. La création de soi par soi, in which he attempted to pull out from Bergson's work an ethical program based on the creation of self by self. Research Associate of the Husserl Archives in Paris (UMR 8457), his interest focuses on the political background of Western metaphysics considered from its ideological principles and consequences. He is also known for having shared the play in Bruno Dumont's film, Hadewijch and for having subsequently played some roles in French auteur cinema but also in the ethnofiction Samira by the ethnographer and filmmaker Nicola Mai. Karl Sarafidis has also contributed to the script for Dumont's film by writing Nassir's lesson on Al-Ghaib.

Biography 

After a childhood spent in Lebanese civil war, Karl Sarafidis left for Athens with his family and then went to Paris, where he studied philosophy with Professor Françoise Dastur.

Bibliography 

 "Rire, sentir, penser", in Affect et affectivité dans la philosophie contemporaine et la phénoménologie. Affekt und Affektivität in der neuzeitlichen Philosophie und der Phänomenologie, Éliane Escoubas & Laszlo Tengelyi, editors, Paris, L'Harmattan, « Ouverture philosophique », 2008.
 "Les deux sources de l'émotion et du logique", in La logique des émotions, E. Cassan, J.-M. Chevalier & R. Zaborowski, editors, Warsaw, Éditions scientifiques de Pologne, Organon, 36, 2008.
 "La rêverie de Bergson. Métaphysique et spiritisme", in Sciences et Fictions, Nice, Alliage, 65, 2009.
 "Dessine-moi une aire de jeux", Lausanne, Espazium, Tracés, 20, 2011. 
 Bergson. La création de soi par soi, Paris, Eyrolles, 2013.
 "Le monde de la perception", in La perception, entre cognition et esthétique, A. Bruzan, J.-M. Chevalier, R. Mocan, R. Vicovanu, editors, Paris, Garnier, « Classiques », 2016.
 "Cosmopolitique de la laideur", Paris, Presses Universitaires de France, Nouvelle Revue d'esthétique, 18, 2016.
 "Projeter un futur ordinaire", interview with Konstantin Gudkov, Lausanne, Espazium, Tracés, 3, 2018.
 "Bergson et la phrase intérieure", in L'homme intérieur et son discours. Le dialogue de l'âme avec elle-même, J.-J. Alrivie, editor, Paris, Vrin, Le Cercle Herméneutique, 2018. 
 "Aidôs", in Presocráticos, A. Ramírez Guijarro, editor, Madrid, Monográfico. Ápeiron. Estudios de filosofía, 2019.
 "Hermès ou Mercure ?", in Des réalités intraduisibles. La traduction au prisme des sciences sociales de l'Antiquité à nos jours. Непереводимая реальность? Перевод сквозь призму общественных наук от Античности до наших дней, P.-L. Six & V. Benet, editors, Moscow, ed. Nouveaux Angles, 2019.
 "Plurilingualism of the same", in For Beirut. لبيروت, Zürich, Roten Fabrik, Fabrikzeitung, 361, 2020.

Filmography 

 2009 : Hadewijch by Bruno Dumont
 2011 : Beirut Hotel by Danielle Arbid
 2013 : La permission by Joyce A. Nashawati
 2014 : Samira by Nicola Mai
 2014 : A Single Body by Sotiris Dounoukos
 2014 : Nectar by Lucile Hadzihalilovic
 2016 : Orpheline by Arnaud des Pallières

References

External links 

 Authority
 imdb
 Rottentomatoes
 Unifrance
 Hadewijch
 Antiatlas Journal,  Variety on September 12, 2009, Le Monde on November 24, 2009 (in French), New York Times on December 24, 2010, Tribune on February 7, 2012, Irishtimes on February 24, 2012 
 Personal pages on UMR 8547 ,  CIERA, CUF,  Sudoc
 On PubMed.gov 
 Conferences at the Institute of Philosophy, Французский философский клуб для франкофонов Москвы Russian Academy of Science (in French) Bergson and the inner life, Bergson and the false problem of Metaphysics, What is reserve?
 Official blog : Orientation

Martin Heidegger
Henri Bergson
Living people
French male film actors
1979 births
21st-century philosophers